Aarón Romero Catalán (born 15 June 1999) is a Spanish footballer who plays as a left back for UD Almería B.

Club career
Romero was born in Castellón de la Plana, Valencian Community, and represented CD Castellón and CF Rafalafena as a youth. He made his senior debut with the reserves on 20 May 2018, starting in a 4–0 Regional Preferente Valenciana away win against CF Sant Jordí.

Romero scored his first senior goal on 9 December 2018, netting his team's second in a 2–0 away win against CF Borriol. He made his first team debut on 16 December 2020, coming on as a late substitute for Jesús Carrillo in a 2–0 win at CD San Fernando, for the season's Copa del Rey.

Romero made his Segunda División debut on 30 May 2021, replacing Carlos Delgado in a 0–3 away loss against Málaga CF, as his side was already relegated. On 31 January 2023, he moved to UD Almería B in Tercera Federación.

References

External links

1999 births
Living people
Sportspeople from Castellón de la Plana
Spanish footballers
Footballers from the Valencian Community
Association football defenders
Segunda División players
Primera Federación players
Divisiones Regionales de Fútbol players
CD Castellón footballers
UD Almería B players